The Augustus Caesar Dodge House is a historic building located in Burlington, Iowa, United States. Augustus C. Dodge came to Burlington as Registrar of the Land Office, a political appointment of President Martin Van Buren. As a Democrat, he went on to serve as the Iowa Territory's Delegate to the U.S. House of Representatives (1840-1846), one of Iowa's first two U.S. Senators (1848-1854), Minister to Spain under Presidents Franklin Pierce and James Buchanan (1855-1859), and then Mayor of Burlington (1874-1875). The two-story, brick house follows an L-shaped plan and was built sometime around in the mid-to-late 1860s. It is representative of Burlington's mid-19th century architecture. The house is not clearly defined by any particular architectural style, but the bracketed eaves allow it to be classified as a vernacular form of the Italianate style. It was listed on the National Register of Historic Places in 1980.

References

Houses completed in 1865
Houses in Burlington, Iowa
Italianate architecture in Iowa
National Register of Historic Places in Des Moines County, Iowa
Houses on the National Register of Historic Places in Iowa